Franklin Tanner Pember (November 2, 1841 – April 6, 1924) was an American entrepreneur, naturalist and philanthropist. Pember founded the Pember Library and Museum in Granville, New York. Pember also constructed the Pember Opera House and provided land for the community sewer systems.

Early life
Pember was born in South Granville, New York, the youngest child and only son of Reuel and Maria Tanner Pember. His sister, Emeline, died when she was four, and his sister Delia died at age 19. Pember grew up on a prosperous family farm, two miles from South Granville on the Hartford road. He attended a nearby one-room schoolhouse.

Career
He was a successful businessman with one of his earliest enterprises being in the nursery business, selling fruit and ornamental trees, shrubs, plants and flowers. He was also a fur trader, forming a partnership with James L. Prouty, his former nursery stock and fur agent. They established the firm of Pember and Prouty, Commission Dealers in Furs and Skins, in New York City in 1873. The firm was located at 129 W. Broadway, and later at 164-166 S. Fifth Avenue. They bought furs from all over the United States and Canada and exported them in large quantities to European markets.

Hobbies
From 1859 to 1861 he studied science at the newly opened college preparatory school, the Fort Edward Collegiate Institute. By the age of 21 Pember was a hunter, trader and taxidermist. During the following 40 years, Pember collected a variety of specimens of birds and mammals, bird nests and eggs, shells, insects, plants and rocks and minerals. His collection became the foundation for the Pember Museum of Natural History. Pember was also responsible for creating a network between professional collectors and museums.

Personal life
Franklin Pember married Ellen Jane Wood of South Granville, New York on February 4, 1868, the only child of David and Caroline Thompson Wood, wealthy farmers and cheese dealers. During the years in which Pember was involved in the fur business they lived in New York City, coming home to Granville for summers and occasional brief visits. They never owned a house in New York City, preferring to rent furnished rooms.

References

External links
Pember Museum

1841 births
1924 deaths
People from Granville, New York
Philanthropists from New York (state)
19th-century American businesspeople